Fairy Falls is a waterfall in the Mount Rainier National Park in Pierce County, Washington. The falls are fed by an unnamed watercourse, which is a tributary of the Cowlitz River.

Historically, the Paradise Glacier fed into two works of Stevens Creek above the tree line,  one of which produces Upper Stevens Creek Falls and the other Fairy Falls. As the glacier retreated throughout the 20th century, the drainage of Fairy Falls was gradually cut off from the glacial melt and now relies entirely on annual snowfall to sustain its flow. The falls diminish greatly in late summer and may dry-out completely during droughts.

See also
 Upper Stevens Creek Falls

References

Mount Rainier National Park
Waterfalls of Pierce County, Washington
Waterfalls of Washington (state)